Colmar station is a SEPTA Regional Rail station in Colmar, Pennsylvania. Located at Bethlehem Pike (PA 309) and Walnut Street, it serves the Lansdale/Doylestown Line.  In FY 2013, Colmar station had a weekday average of 370 boardings and 369 alightings.

Colmar station was originally built in 1856 by the North Pennsylvania Railroad as Line Lexington station, despite being located 1½ miles away from the Village of Line Lexington. In January 1871 a new post office near the station named the surrounding community "Jenkins" and was renamed "Ainsworth" in June of that year, but neither had any effect on the name of the station until two weeks later, when both the village and the station were named "Colmar," which has remained the name of the station ever since.

Station layout

References

External links
SEPTA – Colmar Station
 Station from Bethlehem Pike from Google Maps Street View

SEPTA Regional Rail stations
Stations on the Doylestown Line
Railway stations in Montgomery County, Pennsylvania
Railway stations in the United States opened in 1856